"Floral Decorations for Bananas" is a poem from Wallace Stevens's first book of poetry,  Harmonium (1923). It was first published Measure 26 (Apr. 1923) and is therefore under copyright, however it is quoted here as justified by fair use in order to facilitate scholarly commentary.

The poem's speaker is unhappy about the choice of bananas as a table decoration, complaining that they don't match well with the eglantine and are suitable only for a room of women who are all shanks and bangles and slatted eyes. Recommended instead are plums in an eighteenth-century dish, centering a room in which there would be women of primrose and purl.

Interpretation
This poem finds Stevens, the cool master as Yvor Winters described him, in warm good humor, putting the world's raw material in tension with imagination's desire for a sophisticated construct. The raw bananas don't quite succumb, and there is a suggestion that this is not a bad thing, if only to provide energy and impetus for imagination's renewal. Alternatively, the poem can be interpreted as about the dangers of blatant sexuality and Stevens's "fear of the force of female sexuality".

Surely Marianne Moore had this poem foremost in mind when she compared Stevens's efforts in Harmonium to Henri Rousseau's paintings. There is lushness and sexuality in both.

The poetic device that Robert Buttel noted in connection with "The Apostrophe to Vincentine is at work here too", in what Eleanor Cook, following art historian Ernst Gombrich, calls inverted recognition, "the recognition not of reality in a painting but of a painting inreality".

Notes

References 

 Cook, Eleanor. A Reader's Guide to Wallace Stevens. 2007: Princeton University Press.

1923 poems
American poems
Poetry by Wallace Stevens